or  is one of the environment variables used in DOS, OS/2 and Windows, which normally points to the command line interpreter, which is by default  in DOS, Windows 95, 98, and ME or  in OS/2 and Windows NT. The variable name is written in all-uppercase under DOS and OS/2. Under Windows, which also supports lowercase environment variable names, the variable name is  inside the DOS emulator NTVDM and for any DOS programs, and  under CMD.EXE.

The environment variable by default points to the full path of the command line interpreter. It can also be made by a different company or be a different version.

Another use of this environment variable is on a computer with no hard disk, which needs to boot from a floppy disk, is to configure a ram disk. The COMMAND.COM file is copied to the ram disk during boot and the COMSPEC environment variable is set to the new location on the ram disk. This way the boot disk can be removed without the need to reinsert it after a big application has been stopped. The command line interpreter will be reloaded from the ram disk instead of the boot disk.

References

External links
Creating a customized Command Prompt shortcut - Example of COMSPEC usage

Windows administration
DOS environment variables
Windows environment variables